The Symphony No. 4 in D minor, Op. 120, composed by Robert Schumann, was first completed in 1841. Schumann heavily revised the symphony in 1851, and it was this version that reached publication.

Clara Schumann, Robert's widow, later claimed on the first page of the score to the symphony—as published in 1882 as part of her husband's complete works (Robert Schumanns Werke, Herausgegeben von Clara Schumann, published by Breitkopf & Härtel)—that the symphony had merely been sketched in 1841 but was only fully orchestrated ("vollständig instrumentiert") in 1851. However, this was untrue, and Johannes Brahms, who greatly preferred the earlier version of the symphony, published that version in 1891 despite Clara's strenuous objections.

Movements

The work is scored for two flutes, two oboes, two clarinets, two bassoons, four horns, two trumpets, three trombones, timpani and the usual strings.

The 1851 (published) version of the work is in four movements which follow each other without pause:

The 1841 version, however, used Italian rather than German tempo indications, with the four movements as follows:

Schumann's biographer Peter Ostwald comments that this earlier version is "lighter and more transparent in texture" than the revision, but that Clara "always insisted that the later, heavier, and more stately version [of 1851] was the better one.". Both Bernard Shore and Donald Tovey wrote analyses of the symphony and preferred the earlier orchestration while noting the improved integration of the revision, suggesting that the revised structure could profitably be paired with the original scoring as far as possible. Schumann's deficiencies as a conductor led to him doubling entries between parts, so that the score became "playable but opaque".

The symphony is highly integrated for its time, with thematic material recurring between movements. The slow introduction to the first movement reappears early in the second movement, and then has a violin arabesque based on it. A modification of this arabesque then appears in the trio section of the scherzo. The slow introduction to the finale and its main opening theme incorporate phrases from the main theme of the first movement, in different tempi. Dramatic chords from the first movement also reappear in the finale. Tovey described the overall structure as "possibly Schumann's greatest and most masterly conception".

The scherzo borrows a theme from Symphony No. 1 in F minor, Op. 7 (1824) by Johann Wenzel Kalliwoda (1801–1866), whom Schumann admired.
The first and fourth movements borrow a theme which forms the continuous background for "How blessed are they that have endured" in Felix Mendelsohn's oratorio "St. Paul," a work which Schumann praised in a letter dated March 2, 1839.

Notes

References

John Daverio, "Robert Schumann: Orchestral Works—A Quest for Mastery of the Grand Form," liner notes to Robert Schumann: Complete Symphonies, performed by Orchestre Révolutionnaire et Romantique conducted by John Eliot Gardiner (Archiv Production 289 457 591-2). (Used for publication dates of both versions, other details; also used tempo indications of 1841 version from liner notes.)
Robert Schumann, Complete Symphonies in Full Score. (NY: Dover Publications, 1980.) . (Reprint of Clara Schumann's edition of the symphonies; includes her note on p. 310.)

Further reading
Abraham, Gerald (March 1940). "The Three Scores of Schumann's D Minor Symphony." The Musical Times, vol. 81, No. 1165, pp. 105–109. 
Hallmark, Rufus (1984). "A Sketch Leaf for Schumann's D-Minor Symphony." In Jon W. Finson and R. Larry Todd, eds., Mendelssohn and Schumann: Essays on Their Music and Its Context (Duke University Press), pp. 39–51.

External links

4
1851 compositions
Compositions in D minor